Gosling is an English surname. Notable people with the surname include:

Armine Nutting Gosling (1861–1942), Canadian women's-rights activist
Sir Audley Charles Gosling (1836-1913), British diplomat
Clint Gosling (born 1960), New Zealand footballer
Dan Gosling (born 1990), English footballer, currently playing for Watford
R. Cunliffe Gosling (1868–1922), nineteenth century England football captain
Harry Gosling (1861–1930), British politician and trade union leader
Jake Gosling, English producer and songwriter
James Gosling (born 1955), Canadian software developer, considered father of Java
Joanna Gosling (born 1971), British journalist
John Gosling (disambiguation)
John Gostling (1644–1733) English singer
Mark Gosling (1886-1980) Australian painter and politician
Mike Gosling, (born 1980), United States former Major League Baseball pitcher 
Paula Gosling, (born 1939), English crime writer
Ray Gosling, (1939–2013), English television presenter, journalist and gay rights activist
Raymond Gosling (1926–2015), English scientist
Richard Gosling (born 1974), English strongman
Ryan Gosling (born 1980), Canadian actor
Simon Gosling (born 1969), British modeller and propmaker
William Gosling (1892–1945), English recipient of the Victoria Cross
William Gosling (engineer) (born ca. 1930), British electrical engineer
William Gilbert Gosling (1863–1930), Canadian politician, businessman and author
William Gosling (footballer) (1869–1952), British footballer
William W. Gosling (1824–1883), English landscape painter